is a 2009 Japanese independent drama film directed by Tsuki Inoue. It was shown at the 2009 Yubari International Fantastic Film Festival, it had its international premiere at the 2010 International Film Festival Rotterdam and it was released in Japan on November 26, 2011.

Cast
Kazuhiro Nishijima
Peiton Chiba
Rei Shibakusa as Sister Maria
Takumi Shibuya

Reception
The film was in competition for the Tiger Award at the 2010 International Film Festival Rotterdam. On Midnight Eye, Tom Mes said the film "is an understated piece of work, shot predominantly in long takes from fixed camera positions."

References

External links
 

2009 drama films
2009 independent films
2009 films
Japanese drama films
Japanese independent films
2000s Japanese films